Johannimarkt in Holzen Abbey is a traditional funfair held in Allmannshofen in Swabian district of Augsburg in Bavaria, (Germany) It is a 2-day folk festival during the month of June on the weekend of Johanni around the Holzen Abbey (German: Kloster Holzen). Holzen Abbey is a former abbey of Benedictine order in Allmannshofen in Augsburg Diocese.

Fairground 
The funfair is located on Holzens Abbey Hill.

Amenities

Products  
With approximately 130 vendors, the funfair offers a wide choice of booths selling the latest fashionable items, such as toys, household goods and handicrafts. It features an amusement park with a gun range, a swingboat, carousels and a trampoline, as well as Bavarian beer tents and beer gardens.

Carneys  
Presented carneys on funfair normally came from the Swabian environs or were represented by local associations or other individuals. Ceramics for houses and are sold by handicapped people.

Background music 
Johannimarkt is accompanied by music for brass instruments. The musicians arrive from the vicinity, for example the Ehinger Musikanten (English: Ehingen musicians)or the brass-orchestraoder for youth from Ellgau Viva La Musica.

Organizer 
Johannimarkt is organised in the municipality of Allmannshofen and its local associations, like Freiwilligen Feuerwehr Allmannshofen (English: Auxiliary fire brigade of Allmannshofen) or Schützenverein Gemütlichkeit Allmannshofen (English: gun club Allmannshofen).

Kloster Holzen

References 

Augsburg
Folk festivals in Germany